Jostein Einar Erstad (27 May 1922 – 2 July 2011) was a Norwegian jurist.

He was born in Skodje. He was a police superintendent in Oslo from 1962 to 1966, teacher at the Norwegian Police Academy from 1966 to 1971, public prosecutor in Eidsivating Court of Appeal from 1971 to 1981, chief public prosecutor from 1981 to 1982 and director of the Norwegian Police Surveillance Agency from 1982 to 1990. The Arne Treholt case happened during his directorship.

He died in July 2011.

References

1922 births
2011 deaths
Norwegian police officers
20th-century Norwegian lawyers
Directors of government agencies of Norway
People from Møre og Romsdal